Michele Campisi (born 22 April 1963 in Caltanissetta) is an Italian politician.

He was a member of the centre-right party The People of Freedom and served as Mayor of Caltanissetta from June 2009 to June 2014.

See also
2009 Italian local elections
List of mayors of Caltanissetta

References

External links
 

1963 births
Living people
Mayors of Caltanissetta
The People of Freedom politicians
New Centre-Right politicians